John William Thomas (born 5 August 1958) is an English former professional footballer. He scored 123 goals from 364 appearances in the Football League playing for Tranmere Rovers, Halifax Town, Bolton Wanderers, Chester, Lincoln City, Preston North End, Bolton Wanderers and Hartlepool United.

Playing career

Everton
Born in Wednesbury, upon leaving school in 1974 Thomas signed for Everton as a trainee but in six years with the club failed to make a single appearance, although two loan spells with Tranmere Rovers (11 games 2 goals) in 1978-79 and also with Halifax Town (5 games 0 goals) the following season showed that John was capable of playing in the football league.

Bolton Wanderers
After Everton released him at the end of the 1979–80 season John signed for newly relegated Bolton Wanderers hoping to cement a regular place in the starting line-up and thus kick starting his career. His two years at Burnden Park were however rather stop-start with John struggling to hold a regular place down in the team. In his time at the club, he played in 22 league games, scoring 6 goals.

Chester and Lincoln City
After Bolton gave John a free transfer he signed in July 1982 for fourth division Chester. In his only season at Sealand Road John became a real favorite with the fans, comfortably finishing as the club's top scorer with 20 goals in 44 league games. He was also unsurprisingly voted Chester's player of the season. It was however a shock to the club's fans when the cash strapped club were forced to sell their prize asset to Division Three side Lincoln City for £22,000 after just one season.

His time with The Imps was however a mixed affair with John struggling to find the net with any great regularity and although in his two seasons with the club he netted 18 times in 67 games it therefore came as no surprise when at the end 1984-85 they decided to cash in by selling him to recently relegated Preston North End for £15,000. In his last game for Lincoln he was to witness a nightmare when 56 spectators were killed in a horrendous stand fire while playing Bradford City.

Preston North End
John's stay at Preston started badly, for although John was scoring regularly and forming a potent strike partnership with Gary Brazil, the team as a whole were performing woefully badly finishing the 1985-86 season in 91st position, therefore having to apply for re-election. John however did on a personal note finish the season successfully by picking up the club's official player of the year award for 1985–86.

The following season was however a different story. With a new artificial pitch laid and John McGrath at the helm Preston stormed to promotion with John finishing the season as the club's leading scorer. The rumor, however, of a fall out with manager McGrath only increased with Thomas being dropped several times during the season to be replaced by the likes of Nigel Jemson, Frank Worthington and Steve Taylor. He did though every time regain his place in the team, ending the season with an excellent 28 goals. At the end of his contract in July 1987 he was sold much to the fans dismay to Bolton Wanderers for a bargain £30,000 after finding the net 38 times in just 78 games.

Return to Bolton Wanderers and West Bromwich Albion
His second spell at Bolton was far more successful than his first. In 1987–88 Thomas enjoyed his second successive Division Four promotion, before a comfortable mid-table finish in Division Three the following season. He played on the winning side at Wembley in 1989 in the Football League Trophy final. He was club top-scorer in both seasons, scoring 31 times in 73 games before deciding in July 1989 to sign for his boyhood heroes West Bromwich Albion on a free transfer.

John however spent the majority of his short stay at The Hawthorns on the bench, managing 1 goal in 19 games, although he did score a hat-trick in a 5–3 victory for the Baggies in a Football League Cup tie against Bradford City at Valley Parade. Soon after however, the call came from struggling Preston in February 1990.

Return to Preston North End
After signing for £50,000 and helping North End to beat the drop, hopes for the following season were high. But a broken leg on his return to Bolton Wanderers scuppered these hopes.

Despite recovering from his injury John to struggle to reach the same level again and after just 27 more games and another six goals, he was transferred to fellow Division Three side Hartlepool United in March 1992. One goal in seven games was all John could manage at United before they in turn released him in the summer. John managed one final spell at Halifax Town (12 games 0 goals) in 1992-93 where he teamed up again with John McGrath, with the club destined for relegation out of the Football League.

This also marked the end of John's professional playing days, as he went on to join non-league sides Bamber Bridge. In a career spanning 17 years, John Thomas played 365 league games scoring 123 goals. He is still held in high regard by fans of Preston, Bolton and Chester, the three clubs who benefited most from his predatory goalscoring ability. He now lives in Lostock, Bolton and works as a sports equipment sales executive.

References

1958 births
Living people
English footballers
Everton F.C. players
Bolton Wanderers F.C. players
Tranmere Rovers F.C. players
Chester City F.C. players
Lincoln City F.C. players
West Bromwich Albion F.C. players
Halifax Town A.F.C. players
Hartlepool United F.C. players
Preston North End F.C. players
Bamber Bridge F.C. players
English Football League players
Association football forwards
Sportspeople from Wednesbury